Andrea Davis Pinkney (born 1963) is the author of numerous books for children and young adults, including picture books, novels, works of historical fiction and nonfiction who writes about African-American culture. In addition to her work as an author, Pinkney has had a career as a children's book publisher and editor, including as founder of the Jump at the Sun imprint at Hyperion Books for Children, the Disney Book Group (now Disney Publishing Worldwide). She is vice president and editor-at-large for Scholastic Trade Books.

Her books have won the Coretta Scott King Award and been a Coretta Scott King Honor book, have been ALA Notable Books five times, School Library Journal best books three times, New York Times Editor's Choice and Notable books, and more.

Pinkney is a graduate of Syracuse University's Newhouse School of Public Communications and is a former member of the Newhouse School's Board of Trustees. She lives in New York City with her husband, award-winning illustrator Brian Pinkney, and their two children.

Biography
Andrea Davis was born September 25, 1963, in Washington D.C. and was raised in Connecticut. Her parents were involved in the civil rights movement and exposed her to the cause from early on, even taking her to the annual conference of the National Urban League during many of her summer vacations.

Pinkney graduated from Syracuse University in 1985 with a degree in journalism and began working as an editor at Mechanix Illustrated. She then went on to work as a senior editor at Essence, as well as an editor for the book publishers Simon & Schuster and Scholastic.

While working at one of these early editing jobs, she met Brian Pinkney, a Caldecott Honor-winning children's book illustrator, whom she later married. The two have collaborated on a number of books, including Sit In: How Four Friends Stood Up By Sitting Down, Duke Ellington, Seven Candles for Kwanzaa, and Dear Benjamin Banneker.

She was chosen to deliver the 2014 May Hill Arbuthnot Lecture at the University of Minnesota Libraries, Children's Literature Research Collections, Saturday, May 3, 2014, from 7:00 PM to 9:00 PM (CDT). She was cited in January 2013 for "significant contributions to literature for young people provided through a body of work that brings a deeper understanding of African American heritage".

She currently lives in Brooklyn, New York.

Selected bibliography

Picture books
Duke Ellington: The Piano Prince and His Orchestra 
Ella Fitzgerald – illustrated by Brian Pinkney
Sit in: How Four Friends Stood up by Sitting Down; illustrated by Brian Pinkney
Because of You John Lewis: The True Story of a Remarkable Friendship; illustrated by Keith Henry Brown
A Poem for Peter: The Story of Ezra Jack Keats and the Creation of The Snowy Day; illustrated by Steve Johnson and Lou Fancher
Sojourner Truth’s Step Stomp Stride - illustrated by Brian Pinkney
Seven Candles for Kwanzaa; illustrated by Brian Pinkney
Alvin Ailey; illustrated by Brian Pinkney
And She Was Loved: Toni Morrison’s Life in Stories ; illustrated by Daniel Minter
Boycott Blues: How Rosa Parks Inspired a Nation; illustrated by Brian Pinkney
Martin & Mahalia: His Words, Her Song; illustrated by Brian Pinkney
Dear Benjamin Banneker; illustrated by Brian Pinkney
Bill Pickett Rodeo Ridin’ Cowboy; illustrated by Brian Pinkney
Mims Christmas Jam; illustrated by Brian Pinkney
Fishing Day; illustrated by Shane Evans
Peggony Po; illustrated by Brian Pinkney
Sleeping Cutie; illustrated by Brian Pinkney

Narrative nonfiction
Hand in Hand: 10 Black Men Who Changed America; illustrated by Brian Pinkney
Let it Shine: Stories of Black Women Freedom Fighters; illustrated by Stephen Alcorn
Martin Rising: Requiem for a King; illustrated by Brian Pinkney
Rhythm Ride: a Road Trip through the Motown Sound

Chapter book series
She Persisted: Harriet Tubman 
She Persisted: Ella Fitzgerald
Dear Mr. President: Abraham Lincoln 
Solo Girl 
Meet the Obamas 
Peace Warriors

Middle grade novels
The Red Pencil
Raven in a Dove House
With the Might of Angels
Loretta Little Looks Back: Three Voices go Tell It 
Bird in a Box
Hold Fast to Dreams
Silent Thunder

Young adult
Ten9Eight: Teen Business Blasts Off

Baby books
Bright Brown Baby Treasury 
Peek-a-You
Count to Love 
Baby Boy, You are a Star
Hello, Baby Girl 
Hey, Beautiful You 
Pretty Brown Face  
I Smell Honey 
Watch me Dance 
Shake, Shake, Shake    *All baby books illustrated by Brian Pinkney

Anthologies
Stay True: Short Stories for Strong Girls 
Birthday Wishes
100 Reasons to Love Reading

Honors and awards
 Coretta Scott King award, 2013
 The George Arents Award (Syracuse University's highest alumni honor, presented annually to alumni who have made outstanding contributions to their chosen fields)
 Medgar Evers College Lifetime Achievement Award

References

External links
 Official website

1963 births
American children's writers
Carter G. Woodson Book Award winners
Living people
S.I. Newhouse School of Public Communications alumni
Writers from Brooklyn